Hans Stark (14 June 1921 – 29 March 1991) was an SS-Untersturmführer and head of the admissions detail at Auschwitz-II Birkenau of Auschwitz concentration camp.

Life and SS career
Stark attended the Volksschule in Darmstadt from 1927 until 1931. He had a strict upbringing at the hands of his father, who as a police officer, gave his sons a "typically Prussian education". However, Stark failed to live up to his father's academic expectations, and thus it was decided that the young man needed firmer guidance. Stark left the Realgymnasium in 1937 in the seventh year to apply for Reichsarbeitsdienst or Wehrmacht, but both rejected him due to his age. Notwithstanding, Stark joined the 2nd SS Death's Head brigade 'Brandenburg' (II. SS-Totenkopfstandarte "Brandenburg") in December as its youngest recruit with the written permission of his father, as the SS accepted 16 year old applicants.

At 16 and a half years old, Stark was sent to Oranienburg, where he was the youngest recruit of the unit. There, the SS gave him an intensive indoctrination in the Nazi ideology. In January 1938 he was assigned guard duties at a concentration camp, which most likely was Sachsenhausen. After six months of basic training, Stark was granted his first home visit. He was strictly forbidden from disclosing  at home what was going on at the camp. His father noticed that he appeared depressed, and for that reason, tried to get him out of the SS. From June 1938 to September 1939, he received further training at Buchenwald and Dachau concentration camps.

Auschwitz
At the rank of SS-Unterscharführer, he was posted to Auschwitz at the end of 1940 and worked as a Blockführer (Block leader). In 1941 he was brought into the Political Department and became head of the admissions detail.

In his continued efforts to get his son out of the SS, Stark's father was informed that the only way of doing so was to have him apply to continue his education. From Christmas 1941 to March 1942, Stark returned to his home town and took his final exams as an external candidate at the Justus-Liebig-Gymnasium.

Stark admitted to the shooting of prisoners at Auschwitz:

In his closing speech, Stark stated:

Expert witness Dr Helmut Lechler described Stark:

He was released from prison in 1968, and died on 29 March 1991, aged 69, in his hometown of  Darmstadt.

Bibliography
 Pendas, Devin Owen: The Frankfurt Auschwitz Trial, 1963-1965: Genocide, History, and the Limits of the Law. Cambridge University Press, 2006; .
 Langbein, Hermann: People in Auschwitz. UNC Press, 2004; 
 Klee, Ernst, Dressen, Willi., Riess, Volker: The Good Old Days: The Holocaust as Seen by Its Perpetrators and Bystanders, Free Press, originally from the University of Michigan, 1991; 
 Klee, Ernst: Das Personenlexikon zum Dritten Reich: Wer war was vor und nach 1945. Fischer-Taschenbuch-Verlag, Frankfurt am Main 2007; 
 Rees, Laurence: Auschwitz - the Nazis and the 'Final Solution', BBC Books, 2005, pg. 96;

References

1921 births
1991 deaths
Military personnel from Darmstadt
People from the Grand Duchy of Hesse
Holocaust perpetrators in Poland
Auschwitz concentration camp personnel
SS-Untersturmführer
Buchenwald concentration camp personnel
Dachau concentration camp personnel
Gestapo personnel
Romani genocide perpetrators
Waffen-SS personnel
German prisoners of war in World War II held by the Soviet Union
People convicted in the Frankfurt Auschwitz trials